Non-imprinted in Prader-Willi/Angelman syndrome region protein 1 is a protein that in humans is encoded by the NIPA1 gene.
This gene encodes a potential transmembrane protein which functions either as a receptor or transporter molecule, possibly as a magnesium transporter. This protein is thought to play a role in nervous system development and maintenance. Alternative splice variants have been described, but their biological nature has not been determined. Mutations in this gene have been associated with the human genetic disease autosomal dominant spastic paraplegia 6.

Model organisms
				
Model organisms have been used in the study of NIPA1 function. A conditional knockout mouse line, called Nipa1tm1a(KOMP)Wtsi was generated as part of the International Knockout Mouse Consortium program — a high-throughput mutagenesis project to generate and distribute animal models of disease to interested scientists — at the Wellcome Trust Sanger Institute.

Male and female animals underwent a standardized phenotypic screen to determine the effects of deletion. Twenty four tests were carried out on mutant mice but no significant abnormalities were observed.

References

Further reading

Genes mutated in mice